In mathematics, algebras A, B over a field k inside some field extension  of k are said to be linearly disjoint over k if the following equivalent conditions are met:
(ii) Any k-basis of A remains linearly independent over B.
(iii) If  are k-bases for A, B, then the products  are linearly independent over k.

However, there are examples where  is a domain but A and B are not linearly disjoint: for example, A = B = k(t), the field of rational functions over k.

(cf. Tensor product of fields)

Suppose A, B are linearly disjoint over k. Conversely, if any finitely generated subalgebras of algebras A, B are linearly disjoint, then A, B are linearly disjoint (since the condition involves only finite sets of elements.)

See also 
Tensor product of fields

References 
 P.M. Cohn (2003). Basic algebra

Algebra